Long Walk to Freedom is a 2006 album by the South African isicathamiya group Ladysmith Black Mambazo.

Background
It was released on 24 January 2006 and featured collaborations with artists including Emmylou Harris, Sarah McLachlan, Melissa Etheridge, Joe McBride, Taj Mahal, Hugh Masekela, Zap Mama and many more.

The album was released in an enhanced CD version (HUCD 3019, or #CDGMP 40952 in South Africa) and on Hybrid SACD (HUSA 9019) and has been (for the most part) critically praised. This version was nominated for the Grammy Award for Best Immersive Audio Album.

Track listing

2006 albums
Ladysmith Black Mambazo albums